Joseph or Joe Cartwright may refer to:

 Joseph Cartwright (artist) (1789–1829), English marine painter
 Joe Cartwright (rugby league) (1890–1949), English rugby league footballer of the 1910s and 1920s
 Little Joe Cartwright, a character on the American TV series Bonanza
 Joe Cartwright (footballer) (1888–1955), English footballer